Rathan Mouli is an Indian actor who has appeared in Tamil language films.

Career
Rathan Mouli made his acting debut in Unnaiye Kadhalipen (2010), before going on to work in Parameshwar's Karumpuli (2013) and Anand's Theal. While his first film went largely unnoticed, Karumpuli (2013) gained attention prior to release after the Censor Board had recommended several changes owing to its story on terrorism. Rathan Mouli then collaborated with director Pughazhmani on back-to-back horror films, 13 aam Pakkam Parkka (2015) opposite Sri Priyanka and the horror comedy Vellikizhamai 13am Thethi (2016) opposite Suza Kumar.

His first release in 2017 was the rural action film Arasakulam, while his upcoming films include Yennai Priyadhey which began production in 2013, Malli and Sei (a) Sethumadi.

Filmography

References

Indian male film actors
Tamil male actors
Living people
People from Tamil Nadu
Male actors in Tamil cinema
Year of birth missing (living people)